Zonitoides nitidus (sometimes Zonitoides nitida) is a species of small, air-breathing land snail, a terrestrial pulmonate gastropod mollusc in the family Gastrodontidae.

Zonitoides nitidus is the type species of the genus Zonitoides.

Distribution
The distribution of Zonitoides nitidus includes the Holarctic zone. It is found almost all over Europe except the southernmost regions:

 Czech Republic - least concern (LC)
 Netherlands
 Russia - Sverdlovsk oblast
 Ukraine
 Slovakia
 Great Britain - north British highland zones and not in north Scotland. In some regions in Britain the species has declined due to drainage.
 Ireland
 Hebrides
 Orkney
 Shetland
 rare in northern Greece
 Canada

The non-indigenous distribution of this species includes:
 introduced to Menorca

Description

The shell is reddish brown. The umbilicus is large (almost 25% of shell diameter). The shell is with radial growth lines. The width of the shell is 6–7 mm. The height of the shell is 3.5-4.0 mm.

The animal is black with a characteristic orange dash: the (mantle gland is visible under the shell's aperture).

Juveniles are whitish grey with light brown translucent shells.

Ecology
Zonitoides nitidus occurs in wet meadows and river woods, usually near water bodies, swamps and swampy forests, in the zone of emergent vegetation. Man-made habitats such as pools in old quarries are sometimes colonized after a few years. In Switzerland it is found up to 2100m of altitude.

Zonitoides nitidus is herbivorous. These snails feed on disintegrating leaves, mushrooms, roots and fruit. They do not eat dry leaves. Humid leaves are preferred. When consuming soft food such as mushrooms or soft fruits, Zonitoides nitidus penetrates perpendicularly inside, producing characteristic holes; the entire animal including its shell can penetrate inside the fruit.

In Germany up to three clutches of 2-9 eggs per individual are laid in all seasons, with some days or weeks spacing between egg-laying. Egg diameter is 1.0-1.6 mm. Eggs are laid loose into the soil. Juveniles have 1.5 whorls (diameter 1-1.2 mm) after hatching. They start feeding on disintegrating plant remains in the soil. After 3 months the shell diameter reaches up to 3 mm under favourable conditions, after 10 months 6 mm, and full size after slightly more than one year. Maximum age is 18 months under laboratory conditions.

Parasites of Zonitoides nitidus include:
 Elaphostrongylus spp.
 Parelaphostrongylus tenuis

References
This article incorporates public domain text from the reference.

External links
 
 image of Zonitoides nitidus

Gastrodontidae
Gastropods described in 1774
Taxa named by Otto Friedrich Müller